Frank Baron may refer to:
 Frank Baron (civil engineer) (1914–1994), American professor of civil engineering
 Frank Baron (politician) (1923–2016), Dominica politician

See also
 Frank Barron (disambiguation)